James Edmonds may refer to:

 James Barker Edmonds (1832–1900), American lawyer and politician
 James Edward Edmonds (1861–1956), British Army officer and military historian
 James Edmonds (cricketer) (1951–2011), English cricketer
 James Edmonds (rower) (born 1938), American Olympic rower

See also
 Jim Edmonds (born 1970), baseball player
 James M. Edmunds (1810–1879), politician